Mokrzyca  (formerly German Albertinenhof) is a settlement in the administrative district of Gmina Chociwel, within Stargard County, West Pomeranian Voivodeship, in north-western Poland.

The settlement has a population of 53.

Between 1871 and 1945 the area was part of Germany. For the history of the region, see History of Pomerania.

References

Mokrzyca